The 1922 season was the 3rd season of competitive football in Poland.

Józef Klotz scored the first-ever goal for the Poland national football team. He scored it against Sweden in Stockholm in May 1922, in the team's third international match.

National teams

Poland national team

Notes and references